Sir David Morgan Sloman is the Chief Operating Officer of NHS England. He has previously been the NHS Regional Director for London and the Chief Executive Officer of the Royal Free London NHS Foundation Trust. He was knighted in 2017 for his services to the NHS.

Career
Sir David Sloman was Chief Executive Officer of the Royal Free London NHS Foundation Trust from 2009 to 2018. In 2016 he also became interim accountable officer at North Middlesex University Hospital NHS Trust, as part of the Royal Free's hospital chain project. Under his leadership, the Royal Free became one of only four high-performing foundation trusts to achieve ‘vanguard’ status and in 2018, Sloman oversaw the opening of the new £200m Chase Farm, the most digitally advanced hospital in the NHS. Sloman stepped down in early 2019 to take up a new role as NHS regional director in London.

Sloman was Regional Director for the NHS England London region from 2018 to 2021, where he had oversight of approximately 8,600 GPs, 1,600 GP practices, 18 acute hospital trusts, six specialist trusts, 11 community and mental health trusts and the London Ambulance Service.

Sloman is currently the Chief Operating Officer (COO) for NHS England as of December 2021. As COO, he is the Senior Responsible Officer for the NHS's incident response to the COVID-19 pandemic. As well as overseeing operational delivery across all NHS services in England, he is also responsible for overseeing policy, delivery and programmes of work on urgent and emergency care, elective care, primary care and community services, cancer, mental health, and learning disabilities and autism.

In 2016 the Health Service Journal named him as the third-most influential CEO in the National Health Service and in 2022 he was named the fourth-most influential person in English health policy.

Sloman was knighted in the 2017 New Year Honours for his services to the NHS.

References

English healthcare chief executives
Administrators in the National Health Service
Living people
Knights Bachelor
1961 births